The following match balls were used in the Africa Cup of Nations over the years.

List

See also 
 List of FIFA World Cup official match balls
 List of UEFA European Championship official match balls
 List of Copa América official match balls
 List of AFC Asian Cup official match balls
 List of Olympic Football official match balls

References

External links